Galatin is a village located in northwestern Bulgaria. It is a part of Krivodol Municipality, Vratsa Province.

Geography 
The village is located approximately 26 kilometers to the north of town of Vratsa and 7 kilometers from the town of Krividol. It lie at the both banks of a nameless streamlet, but the native people call it "Bara", 'streamlet'. Neighbouring Galatin are the villages of Devene (East), Osen (Southeast), Lesura (North), and Tri kladentsi (Northeast), Baurene (Northwest), and the town of Krivodol (Southwest).

Villages in Vratsa Province